The , signed as Route K7, is one of the tolled routes of the Shuto Expressway system serving the Greater Tokyo Area and is one of seven of the routes in the system serving Kanagawa Prefecture. Alongside the Daikoku Route, it connects northern Yokohama to the region-spanning Bayshore Route.

Route description
The Yokohama North Route begins at Namamugi Junction with the Yokohane and Daikoku routes in Tsurumi Ward near the mouth of the Tsurumi River. From there it travels west through Tsurumi where it enters a tunnel that carries the majority of the length of the expressway. At the eastern entrance to the tunnel the expressway has a partial interchange with National Route 1. At the western entrance to the tunnel there is another interchange, this one is with Kanagawa Prefecture Route 13. This is also the point where the ramps to and from the Daisan Keihin Road begin and end. The expressway terminates at that highway, but also has access to the local streets in the Tsuzuki Ward where it ends.

The speed limit along the entire length of the Yokohama North Route is set at 60 km/h.

History
The entirety of the Yokohama North Route was opened to traffic on 18 March 2017 instead of being opened in phases like many of the other routes in the Shuto Expressway network. The only addition to the route since its initial opening date is the interchange at Baba, which will open in 2019. The Yokohama North Route was connected the Yokohama Northwest Route, opened by the Metropolitan Expressway Company on 22 March 2020. The new expressway connected the Bayshore Route to the Tōmei Expressway.

Gallery

Junction list
The entire expressway lies within Yokohama in Kanagawa Prefecture

See also

References

External links

K1
2017 establishments in Japan
Roads in Kanagawa Prefecture